Lost Angeles is a 2012 independent comedy-drama film directed by Phedon Papamichael, produced by Papamichael and Chris Gibbin, and written by Chris Merrill. It was shot on a mix of RedMX and Canon EOS 5D Mark II, over the course of 32 days in Los Angeles, California in 2010 and 2011.

Lost Angeles premiered at the 2012 Oldenburg International Film Festival, hosted in Oldenburg, Germany on September 12–16, 2012.

Cast
Kelly Blatz as Jared
Joelle Carter as Jamie Furkes
Mark Boone Junior as Stefan Snie
Laura-Leigh as Hope Larson
Seymour Cassel as the Film Critic
Adam Goldberg as Deepak
Grant Heslov as the Film Producer
Caitriona Balfe  as Veronique
Alex Beh as the Film Director
Ashley Hamilton as Bruce
Timothy V. Murphy as Cliff
Val Lauren as Mickey B
Jasmine Dustin as Mimi
Ricki Noel Lander as Somer
Riker Lynch as Johnny

References

External links

American independent films
2012 films
2012 comedy-drama films
American comedy-drama films
2012 independent films
2010s English-language films
Films directed by Phedon Papamichael
2010s American films